Hubbard Hall, often called "The Boat House," is the historic home of the United States Naval Academys rowing teams in Annapolis, Maryland. Located on Dorsey Creek, off of the Severn River, it was completed in 1930 for the 40-man heavyweight rowing team. It supports the men's lightweight and heavyweight teams and the womens team with over 200 members. The Academy is in the process of completing a new USD $20 million renovation of the entire building including the rowing tank.

Funds for the building were appropriated in 1928, construction began in 1929 and was completed in 1930. The building was designed by architects in the Bureau of Yards and Docks under Rear Admiral Luther E. Gregory.

Hubbard Hall is named for Rear Admiral John Hubbard (1849-1932), a member of the Naval Academys Class of 1870 who as stroke led a Navy crew to victory in 1870. The Hall was the first building at the Academy to be named after a living person.

See also
USNA #Halls and principal buildings
Navy Midshipmen#Facilities

References

External links
Hubbard Hall. US Naval Academy website.
Navy Crew Training Facilities. US Naval Academy website.

Boathouses in the United States
Navy Midshipmen
United States Naval Academy buildings and structures
Buildings and structures completed in 1930